Thomas McNaughton (born October 9, 1983) is an American chef, restaurateur, and cookbook writer. He is the chef and owner of Flour + Water, Penny Roma and Flour+Water Pasta Shop in San Francisco, California.

Thomas involvement with local farmers’ markets for the last 10 years has enabled him to develop close relationships with various producers in the Bay area. These relationships are very important to him and allow him to be involved in the production of the meat and produce that he uses in all of his restaurants. He has been especially dedicated to CUESA and Outstanding in the Field.

Thomas has been nominated three years in a row by the James Beard Foundation for the Rising Star Chef of the Year Award (2011, 2010, 2013). In 2011, Forbes featured Thomas as one of 30 under 30 most influential personalities in the food and beverage world. In 2012, Thomas represented the 1920s in Food & Wine’s ‘American Icons at Every Age feature. That same year, Food & Wine Magazine named him one of the 10 ‘Empire Builders’.

Early life and career
Born in Tabernacle Township, New Jersey to Noble, a nursery owner, and Dorothy McNaughton, a proprietor of Heather Fine Furnishings, Thomas was the youngest of four kids. During his teenage summers, he worked at the Medford Lakes Country Club as a dishwasher and quickly moved up to cook. It was here where he found his passion for the restaurant life and cooking. The energetic and dynamic atmosphere of the kitchen first fascinated him, but as he got older, at around 17 years old, he realized that cooking was definitely what he wanted to pursue.

Thomas started attending the Culinary Institute of America in Hyde Park, New York in 2001. In 2002, he moved to the Bay Area and started working under chef Roland Passot at La Folie. During this year, he cooked classic French food, learned the fundamentals of French cooking and got exposed to the San Francisco restaurant scene for the first time. In 2002, he returned to the Culinary Institute of America and graduated in 2003. He then returned to San Francisco and went on to become sous chef at two of the city's most respected restaurants: Gary Danko and Quince.

In addition to his time in San Francisco, Thomas traveled throughout Europe to work and stage at Michel Rostang in France, Tantrise in Germany, and Sassege in Italy. It was during his travels that he developed a passion for the Italian way of cooking. He then went on to apprenticing at Bruno e Franco. in Bologna where he mastered the art of curing meat and pasta making.

Restaurants

flour + water

At the end of his stay in Bologna, Thomas started looking for cooking positions in San Francisco. It is during this time that he embarked in the opening of a new Italian restaurant in the Mission district of San Francisco with partners David White and David Steele. Most of the beginning conceptualization of the restaurant happened over the phone, with White and Steele in San Francisco while Thomas was still in Bologna. The restaurant opened in May 2009. Thomas describes the inspiration behind it as a combination of refinement and old-world technique. Although, the partners were expecting a small opening, flour + water was a widely success from the beginning.

The James Beard Foundation nominated flour+water for the Best New Restaurant Award on 2010. In 2011, GQ Magazine named flour+water one of the 10 best restaurants of the year. Since its opening, the restaurant has received multiple accolades in a number of publications, both local and national, including 7x7 (magazine), The San Francisco Chronicle, The Washington Post, The New York Times, Food and Wine, Travel + Leisure and others.

central kitchen
   
 After the success of flour+water, Thomas and his partners, David White and David Steele, opened central kitchen in May 2012. Located down the street from flour+water it serves new Californian cuisine focusing on local and sustainable produce. central kitchen serves an always evolving menu of refined food in a casual setting. central kitchen allowed Thomas to highlight his fine dining background with the sensibility for local and sustainable produce of flour+water.

Central kitchen has been acclaimed by critics and the public alike. In 2013, GQ Magazine named central kitchen one of the 12 most outstanding restaurants of the year. The restaurant has received multiple mentions in local and national press, including Conde Nast Traveler, The San Francisco Chronicle, Zagat, SF Weekly and others.

salumeria

In June 2012, Salumeria opened next door to central kitchen. A long time dream of Thomas, he describes the space as ‘the larder of flour+water’. Salumeria offers house-cured meats, cheese, pasta by the pound from flour+water, olive oils, vinegars, etc. The sandwich selection at salumeria received praise from critics and public alike since its opening, including The Wall Street Journal, San Francisco Magazine, Refinery 29, Tasting Table and others.

Thomas is currently working on a 4-season pasta cookbook to be published on Fall 2014.

Awards

Best New Restaurant nominee (flour + water), James Beard Foundation, 2010
San Francisco's Best Pizza, Sunset Magazine, 2010
Rising Star Chef of the Year nominee, James Beard Foundation, 2011
10 Best New Restaurants in America (flour + water), GQ, 2011
30 under 30 Most Influential Personalities in the Food and Beverage World, Forbes, 2011
Rising Star Chef of the Year nominee, James Beard Foundation, 2012
Best Italian Restaurants in the US (flour + water), Travel+Leisure, 2012
Empire Builder, Food&Wine Magazine, 2012
Rising Star Chef of the Year nominee, James Beard Foundation, 2013
Top 100 Restaurants in San Francisco (flour + water, central kitchen), San Francisco Chronicle, 2013
Best New Restaurant in San Francisco (central kitchen), Conde Nast Traveler, 2013
12 Most Outstanding Restaurants (central kitchen), GQ, 2013

References

External links

Interview for Life&Thyme: April 2013
Tortellini en Brodo: June 2011
interview for Grub Street: January 2011
Interview for SF Chefs: June, 2012
Think Blue, Buy Local: May, 2012
"Sean Quigley Design: flou + water": July, 2009
Interview for 7x7 Magazine: May, 2011

American male chefs
American restaurateurs
Cuisine of the San Francisco Bay Area
1983 births
Living people
Chefs of French cuisine
Businesspeople from the San Francisco Bay Area
Restaurant groups in the United States
Culinary Institute of America Hyde Park alumni
People from Tabernacle Township, New Jersey
Chefs from San Francisco